Hélène Vincent (born 9 September 1943) is a French actress and stage director.

Career
She received a César Award for Best Supporting Actress in 1989 for her role as Madame Marielle Le Quesnoy in Life Is a Long Quiet River and a nomination in 1992 for J'embrasse pas.

Theater

Filmography

References

External links

 

1943 births
Living people
Best Supporting Actress César Award winners
French film actresses
French stage actresses
French television actresses
20th-century French actresses
21st-century French actresses